William James McCullough (born 27 July 1935) is a former footballer who made more than 250 appearances for Arsenal in the Football League and was capped 10 times for Northern Ireland.

Career
Born in Carrickfergus, McCullough first played for Portadown, before being signed in 1958 for £5,000 by London club Arsenal.  A left back, he soon made his debut for the club, against Luton Town on 26 December 1958. He only played ten matches that season, but after Len Wills was moved to right back at the start of 1959-60, McCullough became Arsenal's' regular left back.

McCullough became known for his consistency and fitness – he wore the No. 3 shirt for Arsenal for the next six seasons, missing only a handful of matches. Although Arsenal had reached third place in his first season at the club, for the rest of his career in the side the club dwelled in mid-table and never challenged for honours.

He won his first cap for Northern Ireland in a friendly against Italy on 25 April 1961, which Northern Ireland lost 3-2. He went on to appear ten times for his country, scoring no goals, with his final cap coming against England in a 2-0 defeat on 22 October 1966.

By 1965-66, McCullough had competition for his place, in the shape of the young Peter Storey. When Bertie Mee took over at Arsenal at the end of that season, looking to build a young side, he transfer listed the 31-year-old McCullough during the close season. He had played 268 matches in total for Arsenal, scoring 5 goals. He was sold to Millwall in August 1966, and later had spells at Bedford Town, Cork Celtic and Derry City.

References
General

Specific

1935 births
Living people
People from Carrickfergus
Association footballers from Northern Ireland
Northern Ireland international footballers
Association football fullbacks
Portadown F.C. players
Arsenal F.C. players
Millwall F.C. players
Bedford Town F.C. players
Cork Celtic F.C. players
Derry City F.C. players
English Football League players
League of Ireland players